Polona Hercog and Jessica Moore were the defending champions, but did not compete in the Juniors this year.

Elena Bogdan and Noppawan Lertcheewakarn won in the final 3–6, 6–3, 10–8, against Tímea Babos and Heather Watson.

Seeds

Draw

Finals

Top half

Bottom half

External links
Draw

Girls' Doubles
French Open, 2009 Girls' Doubles